Alex Burger is an American playwright and screenwriter, based in Los Angeles. He is known as head writer for Seasons 3 and 4 of Umlilo (Zulu for “The Fire”), the SAFTA Award-winning South African drama.

Early life and education
Burger grew up in Wenham, Massachusetts. When he was a child, he and his family were a part of a 60-person magic troupe, performing in over 1,200 performances of Le Grand David and his Own Spectacular Magic Company. Burger attended Deep Springs College in California and then Harvard College, where he graduated magna cum laude in Comparative Study of Religion. He earned an MBA at INSEAD in Singapore and France.

In his 20s, Burger worked with Mother Teresa in Calcutta, India, and then went on to do civil rights work in Alabama for seven years, where he wrote numerous publications. He was awarded the “Spirit of Dr. King Award” for his work on racial justice.

Writing career 
Burger began work as a poet, winning the Alabama State Poetry Society Award in 1997. He then wrote for the theatre; his first play, Ain’t Nothin’ Changed, was performed in San Francisco as part of the Playground Theatre Festival and then won the Harvardwood writing competition in 2010. His play Whose Blood: A Tale of Desire and Despair Set in a 19th Century Operating Theatre had a fully sold-out run at London’s Old Operating Theatre in 2012. The play was then written up in Wellcome Trust Magazine and was the subject of a chapter in the book Challenging History in the Museum. Other plays include Mashoga (My Wife) (Glasgow Any Objections Festival 2013), The Inkanyamba (Market Theatre Lab, 2015), and Fees Must Fall (Wits University, 2016).

Burger's work in television includes head-writing Seasons 3 and 4 of the SAFTA Award-winning television show Umlilo (e.tv 2015-2016). The show was the most-watched drama in South Africa at the time and has won awards for Best Drama and Best Writing. Other credits include writing for Doubt (Mzanzi Magic, 2016), Hard Copy Season 4 (SABC 3, 2016), 90 Plein Street Season 5 (SABC 2, 2016), and Isithembiso (2017). He has also successfully created projects for Stained Glass Productions, Quizzical Pictures, and The Bomb Production Company.

In addition to writing, Burger is also a writing instructor, having lectured in writing at the University of Witwatersrand (2015-2016), Market Theatre Laboratory (2014-2016), and the California Institute for Integral Studies (2017–present).  Burger’s nonfiction work includes the unpublished manuscript Someday It Will Rain: A Journey Through Big Oil and Development in Africa, for which he is represented by Lowenstein and Associates in New York City.

Since 2017, Burger is based in Los Angeles where he is working on a number of television projects including co-creating a new series with author Carolyn Cooke, co-writing a feminist TV show  Here She Comes about two experimental sex therapists, and working on a web-series for Mundo Loco films.

He recently served as the head writer for the first of its kind South African Afrikaans Drama Die Testament found online at Network 24 which launched September, 2019.

Activist career 
Burger has 25 years’ experience running development and civil rights projects in Africa, Asia, Europe, and the USA. He has a long-standing relationship with the International Finance Corporation (IFC), the private sector division of the World Bank, where he won the IFC Corporate Award. He served as the Vice President of Community Affairs for AngloGold Ashanti, Africa’s largest mining company, from 2011 to 2013. He has served on numerous boards, including the United Way of Central Alabama, the Southern Partners Fund, and Be Strong Families.

Filmography

Television Series

Head Writer

Storyline

Story

Storyline

Story Consultant

Head Writer

Plays

Writer

Writing Awards and Recognition 
 Member of the London Royal Court Theatre’s Invitation Writer’s Group, 2011
 Harvardwood 1st Place Playwriting Competition, 2010
 Harvard Alumni A.R.T. Grant to support the development of the play Whose Blood, 2010
 1st Prize Short Fiction Competition Award sponsored by the Times Literary Supplement (UK), 2009
 1st Prize Alabama State Poetry Society Competition, 1997

References

External links 
 Alex Burger on IMDB https://www.imdb.com/name/nm8261011/)
 Alex Burger Website http://www.alexburgerart.com/

1972 births
Living people
Harvard College alumni
People from Wenham, Massachusetts